Jerry Nathan Bell, known as Nate Bell (born July 17, 1969), is an Independent politician from Mena in the U.S. state of Arkansas, who served three two-year terms in the Arkansas House of Representatives. From 2013 to 2017, he represented District 20, which encompasses Polk and Montgomery counties. From 2011 to 2013, he was the representative for District 22. He was a Republican prior to 2015.

Business career
Bell is founder and managing partner of Quad B Specialties, LLC, a licensed commercial and residential construction firm.

Early political career

Bell was elected constable of Potter Township in Polk County in 2004, 2006, and 2008.

General Assembly

In 2010, Bell defeated the Democrat
Orvin Foster, 5,022 (60 percent) to 3,355 (40 percent) to win the District 22 seat vacated by the Democrat Bill Abernathy.

In 2012, Bell was switched to District 20, in which he defeated another Democrat, Lewis Diggs, 6,696 to 3,592. This seat was vacated by the Democrat, the term-limited Johnnie Roebuck.

In the 89th General Assembly, Bell served on the House Revenue and Taxation Committee and the State Agencies and Governmental Affairs Committee.

In March 2015, Bell provided forceful support for fellow legislator Justin Harris during his rehoming (aka child abandonment) scandal.

Voting history
Bell's voting includes:

Controversies
Bell is nationally known for his polarizing and controversial commentary on social issues, including:

The Hitler incident

Bell received criticism for "misquoting" Adolf Hitler's Mein Kampf. The quote was considered incorrect by those opposing Bell's political positions, nonetheless Bell stood by the quote.

The abortion incident

Bell exchanged e-mails with an Arkansas resident living outside his district, regarding his stance on abortion.

Boston Marathon bombing comments

In response to news reports of a lockdown in the Boston metropolitan area, on April 19, 2013, Bell tweeted, "I wonder how many Boston liberals spent the night cowering in their homes wishing they had an AR-15 with a hi-capacity magazine?".

Bell's remarks outraged many in Massachusetts, Arkansas, and throughout the country.  The Republican then Speaker of the Arkansas House of Representatives, Davy Carter, called the remark "inappropriate and insensitive."  Then Democratic minority leader Greg Leding of Fayetteville, said, "The people of Boston are not cowards. They are patriots. ... No one, including Representative Bell, should ever infer that the American people are anything other than courageous, and the only words we should be offering to the people of Boston are those of support and of prayer."

Personal life
Bell is involved in many community and civic organizations, including Rotary International, 4-H Clubs (volunteer leader), Poultry Partners, the National Rifle Association, and the Polk County Farm Bureau. He is also a member of LeadAR, the Western Arkansas Fire Rescue Association, and the Potter Volunteer Fire Department. Bell attends the non-denominational Grace Bible Church. Bell and his wife, Phyllis, have two daughters, Victoria and Hannah.

Bell did not seek a fourth term in the state House in 2016. A Republican, John Maddox instead won the position. Bell still has ten years of eligibility in the state legislature should he decide to serve again.

References

1969 births
Living people
Members of the Arkansas House of Representatives
Arkansas Independents
Arkansas Republicans
People from Mena, Arkansas
Businesspeople from Arkansas
American real estate businesspeople
21st-century American politicians